Irina Spîrlea was the defending champion but lost in the second round to Stephanie Devillé.

Barbara Schett won in the final 6–3, 6–3 against Sabine Hack.

Seeds
A champion seed is indicated in bold text while text in italics indicates the round in which that seed was eliminated.

  Irina Spîrlea (second round)
  Sabine Hack (final)
  Silvia Farina (semifinals)
  Barbara Schett (champion)
  Florencia Labat (second round)
  Barbara Rittner (first round)
  Gala León García (first round)
  Henrieta Nagyová (quarterfinals)

Draw

External links
 1996 Internazionali Femminili di Palermo Draw

Internazionali Femminili di Palermo
1996 WTA Tour